Jang Yoon-jung (born 11 June 1966) is a South Korean former taekwondo practitioner. She won the silver medal at the 1988 Summer Olympics, where taekwondo was a demonstration sport, in the heavyweight event. At the 1988 Asian Taekwondo Championships she became Asian Champion in the heavyweight category.

References

1966 births
Living people
South Korean female taekwondo practitioners
Place of birth missing (living people)
Olympic taekwondo practitioners of South Korea
taekwondo practitioners at the 1988 Summer Olympics
World Taekwondo Championships medalists
20th-century South Korean women